Diisopropylphosphite is an organophosphorus compound with the formula (i-PrO)2P(O)H (i-Pr = CH(CH3)2). The molecule is tetrahedral.  It is a colorless viscous liquid.  The compounds can be prepared by treating phosphorus trichloride with isopropanol.

References

Organophosphites